Overlord is an anime series based on the light novel series of the same name written by Kugane Maruyama and illustrated by so-bin. The second season was announced at film screenings of the second compilation film. It aired from January 10 to April 4, 2018 an. The season also saw a change in broadcast network with Sun TV and KBS Kyoto dropping the series while MBS added the series to its schedule.

Funimation has licensed the second season for a simuldub.

The opening theme is "Go Cry Go" by OxT while the ending theme is "Hydra" by Myth & Roid.


Episode list

Home media release

Japanese

English

Notes

References

Overlord episode lists
2018 Japanese television seasons